Lindóia is a municipality in the state of São Paulo, Brazil.

Lindóia is one of 11 municipalities considered spas by the State of São Paulo, in that it fulfills certain prerequisites set by state law. That status ensures those municipalities a special budget from the state for the promotion of regional tourism. Also, the municipality acquires the right to add its name next to the title of Hidromineral, the term by which it is known by both municipal officials and the state.

Lindóia is considered the Brazilian "National Capital of Mineral Water", as 40% of all bottled water consumed in Brazil comes from Lindóia. Bottlers in Lindóia include Lindoya Premium, Lindoya Bioleve, Lindoya Summer, Lindoya Life, Lindoya Original, Lindoya Joia, and Lindoya Genuine. These companies are allowed to take Lindoya in their packaging for demonstration of the origin of mineral water.

References

Municipalities in São Paulo (state)
Portuguese words affected by the 1990 spelling reform